The Timeline of the British Army 1700–1799 lists the conflicts and wars in which the British Army was involved.

War of the Spanish Succession 1701–1714
Great Northern War 1717–1720
War of the Austrian Succession 1740
Carnatic Wars 1744–1763
Seven Years' War 1756–1763
Anglo-Mysore Wars 1766–1799
First Anglo-Maratha War 1775–1782
American Revolutionary War 1775–1783
French Revolutionary Wars 1792–1802

See also
Timeline of the British Army 1800–1899
Timeline of the British Army 1900–1999
Timeline of the British Army since 2000

18th-century conflicts
Wars involving Great Britain
18th-century history of the British Army
18th century in Great Britain
British Army 1700-1799